The 1984 Korean Super League was the second season of top football league in South Korea. A total of eight teams participated in the league. Six of them were professional teams (Hallelujah FC, Yukong Elephants, Daewoo Royals, POSCO Dolphins, Lucky-Goldstar Hwangso, Hyundai Horang-i), and the other teams were semi-professional teams (Hanil Bank and Kookmin Bank). It began on 31 March and ended on 11 November. It divided into two stages, and winners of each stage qualified for the championship playoffs. It gave 3 points for a win, 2 points for a draw, and 1 point for a draw without a goal.

Schedule

Regular season

First stage

Second stage

Overall table

Championship playoffs

Top scorers

Awards

Main awards

Source:

Best XI

Source:

Monthly Golden Ball

Source:

See also
1984 K League Championship

References

External links
 RSSSF
 Official website 

K League seasons
1
South Korea
South Korea